Andrzej Tichý (born 19 December 1978, Prague, Czech Republic) is a Swedish-Czech-Polish writer who has lived in Malmö, Sweden since 1981. He has written several novels and is regarded as one of the most important novelists of his generation. He has been nominated for the Nordic Council Literature Prize and the August Prize for Best Fiction Book of the Year. His fifth novel, Wretchedness (2020) published by And Other Stories, is his first to be translated into English and focuses on immigrants and the migrant crisis in Sweden. Speaking on the book with The Guardian, Tichý said: ‘From the outside, Sweden was this paradise. But it was never actually true’.

Books 
 Sex liter luft (2005)
 Fält (2008)
 Karios (2013)
 Omsorgen (2015)
 Wretchedness (Eländet, 2016) translated by Nichola Smalley, 2020

References 

1978 births
Swedish novelists
Czech emigrants to Sweden
Swedish people of Polish descent
Swedish people of Czech descent
Living people
Writers from Malmö
Writers from Prague